The Tramp and the Dog (1896) is believed to be the first commercial production of American film pioneer William Selig at Selig Polyscope.  It is also likely the first commercial narrative film shot in Chicago. Described as a "backyard comedy" (filmed in the Rogers Park neighborhood), in the opening bit, a baker comes outdoors into her yard and leaves a pie on a chair to cool. A tramp hops the fence into the backyard grabs the pie and seeks to hop back over the fence.   A bulldog appears who catches the backside of the tramp as he tries to escape, leading to various pratfalls, and the woman reappearing with a broom. 

The film became very popular and was distributed throughout North America and Europe. It began a film trend known as "pants humor" where the loss or threatened loss of the character's trousers formed the gag, and it led to a number of filmmakers to feature tramps and hobos in short comedic situations.  It was a lost film until 2021, when it was rediscovered in the film archives of the National Library of Norway, where it shared a film strip with a version of another previously lost Selig production, Something Good – Negro Kiss.

References

Selig Polyscope Company films
Silent American comedy films
1896 films